The second season of the American television series Warehouse 13 premiered on July 6, 2010, and concluded on December 7, 2010, on Syfy. Season two maintained the Tuesdays at 9:00 pm ET timeslot from the previous season. The season consisted of 13 episodes. The show stars Eddie McClintock, Joanne Kelly, Saul Rubinek, Genelle Williams and Allison Scagliotti.

Synopsis
Season two begins right after the events of the season finale of season one. Pete and Myka find that Artie has survived the explosion thanks to the Phoenix artifact, which was slipped into his pocket by MacPherson during their struggle. Though the Phoenix saves Artie from the explosion, in exchange, it causes Mrs. Frederic's driver to die and then explode, with Mrs. Frederic barely surviving by jumping out of the car before the explosion. While still under MacPherson's control, Leena locates another past Warehouse agent named H.G. Wells. She reverses the bronzing process, freeing her to assist MacPherson in penetrating the Escher Vault inside the Warehouse. Wells eventually turns on MacPherson and kills him after taking an artifact from the Vault. Mrs. Frederic realizes that Leena was the one stealing Artifacts from the Warehouse for MacPherson while under the Pearl of Wisdom's control and helps remove the artifact from Leena's brain. Later, when Artie starts seeing MacPherson over the Warehouse, Leena explains that the visions may indicate that he has some unfinished business with MacPherson. Meanwhile, Leena keeps having vertigo, and it is revealed that her condition is due to residual energy from MacPherson trapped in her brain, which Mrs. Frederic and The Regents removed.

Later in season two, H.G. Wells returns and starts helping them collect artifacts and is reinstated as an agent, which annoys Artie since he doesn't trust her. After Warehouse 2 is reactivated, Mrs. Frederic starts to have visions of Warehouse 2 that are slowly killing her. In the event of Mrs. Frederic's death, Claudia finds out that she would then take over as the new Warehouse caretaker, which upsets her. Pete, Myka, H.G., and Benedict Valda attempt to deactivate Warehouse 2, and so the other can continue onward, Valda ends up sacrificing himself. When they finally deactivate Warehouse 2, they find out that H.G. was looking for Warehouse 2 so she could get the Minoan Trident and create another ice age. Myka and Artie track H.G. down and stop her from causing another ice age. Due to the preceding events, Myka realizes that she was wrong to trust H.G. and resigns as a warehouse agent, worrying that the mistake will haunt her and keep her from being an effective agent.

Cast

Main
 Eddie McClintock as Pete Lattimer
 Joanne Kelly as Myka Bering
 Saul Rubinek as Artie Nielsen
 Genelle Williams as Leena
 Allison Scagliotti as Claudia Donovan

Recurring
 C. C. H. Pounder as Mrs. Irene Frederic
 Roger Rees as James MacPherson
 Jaime Murray as Helena G. Wells
 Paula Garcés as Kelly Hernandez
 Nolan Gerard Funk as Todd
 Mark A. Sheppard as Benedict Valda

Guest
 Sean Maher as Sheldon
 Jewel Staite as Loretta
 Neil Grayston as Douglas Fargo
 Philip Winchester as Raymond St. James
 Faran Tahir as Adwin Kosan
 Tia Carrere as Kate Logan
 Lindsay Wagner as Dr. Vanessa Calder
 René Auberjonois as Hugo Miller
 David Anders as Jonah Raitt
 Cody Rhodes as Kurt Smoller
 Simon Reynolds as Daniel Dickinson
 Laura Harris as Lauren Andrews
 Armin Shimerman as Charlie Martin
 Judd Hirsch as Isadore Weisfelt
 Paul Blackthorne as Larry Newley

Production
On August 20, 2009, Warehouse 13 was renewed for a second season. The second season consists of 13 episodes and started airing on July 6, 2010. Season two marked the first crossover event with fellow Syfy series Eureka. Douglas Fargo (Neil Grayston) from Eureka appeared in the August 3, 2010 episode of Warehouse 13, while Claudia Donovan (Allison Scagliotti) appeared on Eureka on August 6, 2010. In December 2010 there was a standalone Christmas episode. Each episode contains hidden references to one of the twelve signs of the Zodiac. This was promoted using an online competition "Hunt for the Zodiac Sweepstakes".

Episodes

DVD release

References

General references

External links

 
 

2
2010 American television seasons